Milwaukee Avenue may refer to:

Milwaukee Avenue (Chicago), Chicago and suburbs, Illinois
Milwaukee Avenue Historic District, Minneapolis, Minnesota
Milwaukee Avenue, Lubbock, Texas